Choreutis chalcotoxa is a moth in the family Choreutidae. It was described by Edward Meyrick in 1886. It is found in Tonga.

References

Choreutis
Moths described in 1886